The Holland Park Ward is a Brisbane City Council ward covering Holland Park, Holland Park West, Mt Gravatt, Mt Gravatt East and Tarragindi.

Councillors for Holland Park Ward

Results

References 

City of Brisbane wards